Jan Niemiec may refer to:
 Jan Niemiec (bishop) (1958–2020), Polish-born Ukrainian Roman Catholic bishop
 Jan Niemiec (canoeist) (1941–2017), Polish slalom canoeist